Louis Armand de Bourbon, prince de Conti may refer to:

 Louis Armand de Bourbon, 3rd prince de Conti (1661-1685)  
 Louis Armand de Bourbon, 5th prince de Conti (1695-1727), his nephew